The lateral marginal vein is a continuation of the dorsal venous arch of the foot. It is the origin of the short saphenous vein.

See also
 Medial marginal vein

References

Veins of the lower limb